Filiz Vural (born 1953) is a former Turkish beauty contestant and Miss Europe 1971.

She participated at a beauty pageant organized by the newspaper Hürriyet, and won the title Miss Turkey 1970.  The next year, she represented her country at the Miss Europe beauty contest held in Tunis, Tunisia, and was crowned Miss Europe on September 18, 1971. 

She is married to Engin Çağlar, a former film actor, they were married in 1972.

References

Miss Turkey winners
Miss Europe winners
Living people
1953 births